Jan Ras (born 28 January 1999) is a Dutch professional footballer who plays as a midfielder for SV Urk.

Professional career
Born in Urk, Flevoland, Ras is a youth product of Heerenveen, having joined them at the age of 8. On 7 December 2017, Ras signed his first professional contract with Heerenveen for three years. Ras made his professional debut with Heerenveen in a 1–1 Eredivisie draw with Feyenoord on 11 August 2019.

References

External links
 

1999 births
Living people
People from Urk
Footballers from Flevoland
Dutch footballers
Association football midfielders
SC Heerenveen players
Eredivisie players